Toni Cade Bambara, born Miltona Mirkin Cade (March 25, 1939 – December 9, 1995), was an African-American author, documentary film-maker, social activist and college professor.

Biography

Early life and education 
Miltona Mirkin Cade was born in Harlem, New York, to parents Walter and Helen (Henderson) Cade. She grew up in Harlem, Bedford Stuyvesant (Brooklyn), Queens and New Jersey. At the age of six, she changed her name from Miltona to Toni, and then in 1970 changed her name to include the name of a West African ethnic group, Bambara, after finding the name written as part of a signature on a sketchbook discovered in a trunk among her great-grandmother's other belongings. With her new name, she felt it represented "the accumulation of experiences", in which she had finally discovered her purpose in the world. In 1970, Bambara had a daughter, Karma Bene Bambara Smith, with her partner Gene Lewis, an actor and a family friend.

Bambara attended Queens College in 1954, where almost the entire undergraduate student population were white. At first, she planned to become a doctor, but her passion for arts directed her to become an English major. As Bambara had a passion for jazz and different forms of art in general, she became a member of the Dance Club of Queens College. She also took part in theater, where she was designated as stage manager and costume designer. Bambara was among those who participated in folk singing when it first emerged in the 1950s, when the songs had a political message inscribed in them. Bambara graduated from Queens College with a B.A. in Theater Arts/English Literature in 1959.

Work and study 
Later on, she went on to study mime at the Ecole de Mime Etienne Decroux in Paris, France. She became interested in dance before completing her master's degree at City College, New York, in 1964, while serving as program director of Colony Settlement House in Brooklyn. She also worked for New York social services and as a recreation director in the psychiatric ward of Metropolitan Hospital. From 1965 to 1969 she was with City College's "Search for Education, Elevation, Knowledge" (SEEK) program and helped with its development. She taught English, published material and worked with SEEK's black theatre group. Bambara was also an English instructor for the New Careers Program of Newark, New Jersey, in 1969. She was made assistant professor of English at Rutgers University's new Livingston College in 1969 and continued until 1974. She was visiting professor in Afro-American Studies at Emory University and at Atlanta University (1977), where she also taught at the School of Social Work (until 1979). Bambara was production-artist-in-residence at Neighborhood Arts Center (1975–79), at Stephens College in Columbia, Missouri (1976), and at Atlanta's Spelman College (1978–79). From 1986 she taught film-script writing at Louis Massiah's Scribe Video Center in Philadelphia. Bambara also held lectures at the Library of Congress and the Smithsonian Institution, where she conducted literary readings.

Toni Cade Bambara was diagnosed with colon cancer in 1993 and two years later died in Philadelphia, Pennsylvania.

Activism 
Bambara worked within black communities to create consciousness around ideas such as feminism and black awareness. As Bambara had become part of the faculty of City College, she strived to make it more inclusive. To do this, she wanted to add more classes, such as a nutrition course, to teach students more about their culture. Bambara also wanted to see a creation of an academy that generated an environment in which students could become more involved in learning more about political and social problems in the community as well as their culture.

Bambara participated in several community and activist organizations, and her work was influenced by the Civil Rights and Black Nationalist movements of the 1960s. In the early to mid-1970s, she traveled to Cuba along with Robert Cole, Hattie Gossett, Barbara Webb, and Suzanne Ross to study how women's political organizations operated. She put these experiences into practice in the late 1970s after moving with her daughter Karma Bene to Atlanta, Georgia, where Bambara co-founded the Southern Collective of African American Writers.

Literary career 
Bambara was active in the 1960s Black Arts Movement and the emergence of black feminism. In her writings, she was inspired by New York's streets and its culture, where the culture influenced her due to her experience of the teachings of "Garveyites, Muslims, Pan-Africanists and Communists against the backdrop and the culture of jazz music". Her anthology The Black Woman (1970), including poetry, short stories, and essays by Nikki Giovanni, Audre Lorde, Alice Walker, Paule Marshall and herself, as well as work by Bambara's students from the SEEK program, was the first feminist collection to focus on African-American women. Tales and Stories for Black Folk (1971) contained work by Langston Hughes, Ernest J. Gaines, Pearl Crayton, Alice Walker and students. 
She wrote the introduction for another groundbreaking feminist anthology by women of color, This Bridge Called My Back (1981), edited by Gloria Anzaldúa and Cherríe Moraga. While Bambara is often described as a "feminist", in her chapter entitled "On the Issue of Roles", she writes: "Perhaps we need to let go of all notions of manhood and femininity and concentrate on Blackhood."

Bambara's 1972 book, Gorilla, My Love, collected 15 of her short stories, written between 1960 and 1970. Most of these stories are told from a first-person point of view and are "written in rhythmic urban black English." The narrator is often a sassy young girl who is tough, brave, and caring and who "challenge[s] the role of the female black victim". Bambara called her writing "upbeat" fiction. Among the stories included were "Blues Ain't No Mockin Bird" as well as "Raymond's Run" and "The Lesson". This collection of short stories mirrored the behavior of Bambara, in which was described as "dramatic, often flamboyant, with a penchant for authentic emotion".

Her novel The Salt Eaters (1980) centers on a healing event that coincides with a community festival in a fictional city of Claybourne, Georgia. In the novel, minor characters use a blend of modern medical techniques alongside traditional folk medicines and remedies to help the central character, Velma, heal after a suicide attempt. Through the struggle of Velma and the other characters surrounding her, Bambara chronicles the deep psychological toll that African-American political and community organizers can suffer, especially women. Bambara continues to investigate ideas of illness and wellness in the black community with a call to action through her characters. “Velma must  (and by extension black women) re-affirm healthy relationships with one another that create and sustain pathways towards wholeness and reprioritize black women’s health in the larger domain of social justice movements.” While The Salt Eaters was her first novel, she won the American Book Award. In 1981, she also won the Langston Hughes Society Award.

After the publication and success of The Salt Eaters, she focused on film and television production throughout the 1980s. From 1980 to 1988, she produced at least one film per year.  Bambara wrote the script for Louis Massiah's 1986 film The Bombing of Osage Avenue, which dealt with the massive police assault on the Philadelphia headquarters of the black liberation group MOVE on May 13, 1985. The film was a success, viewed at film festivals and airing on national public broadcasting channels.

The novel Those Bones Are Not My Child (whose manuscript was titled "If Blessings Come") was published posthumously in 1999. It deals with the disappearance and murder of 40 black children in Atlanta between 1979 and 1981. It was called her masterpiece by Toni Morrison, who edited it and also gathered some of Bambara's short stories, essays, and interviews in the volume Deep Sightings & Rescue Missions: Fiction, Essays & Conversations (Vintage, 1996).

Bambara's work was explicitly political, concerned with injustice and oppression in general and with the fate of African-American communities and grassroots political organizations in particular.

Female protagonists and narrators dominate her writing, which was informed by radical feminism and firmly placed inside African-American culture, with its dialect, oral traditions and jazz techniques. Like other members of the Black Arts Movement, Bambara was heavily influenced by "Garveyites, Muslims, Pan-Africanists, and Communists" in addition to modern jazz artists such as Sun Ra and John Coltrane, whose music served not only as inspiration but provided a structural and aesthetic model for written forms as well. This is evident in her work through her development of non-linear "situations that build like improvisations to a melody" to focus on character and building a sense of place and atmosphere. Bambara also credited her strong-willed mother, Helen Bent Henderson Cade Brehon, who urged her and her brother Walter Cade (an established painter) to be proud of African-American culture and history.

Bambara contributed to PBS's American Experience documentary series with Midnight Ramble: Oscar Micheaux and the Story of Race Movies. She also was one of four filmmakers who made the collaborative 1995 documentary W. E. B. Du Bois: A Biography in Four Voices.

Awards and recognition
Bambara was posthumously inducted into the Georgia Writers Hall of Fame in 2013.

Fiction  
 Gorilla, My Love. New York: Vintage, 1972 (short stories) 
 War of the Walls 1976, My Love. New York: Random House, 1972 (short stories)
 "Blues Ain't No Mockin Bird"
 The Lesson. New York: Bedford/St.Martin's, 1972 (short stories)
 "The Lesson"
 The Sea Birds Are Still Alive: Collected Stories. New York: Random House, 1977 (short stories)
 "A Girl's Story"
 The Salt Eaters. New York: Random House, 1980 (novel)
 Toni Morrison (editor): Deep Sightings and Rescue Missions: Fiction, Essays and Conversations. New York: Pantheon, 1996 (various)
 Those Bones Are Not My Child. New York: Pantheon, 1999 (novel)
 This Bridge Called My Back. Fourth Edition. New York: 2015 (various)

Academic 
 The American Adolescent Apprentice Novel. City College of New York, 1964. 146 pp.
 Southern Black Utterances Today. Institute of Southern Studies, 1975.
 What Is It I Think I'm Doing Anyhow. In: J. Sternberg (editor), The Writer on Her Work: Contemporary Women Reflect on Their Art and Their Situation. New York: W.W. Norton, 1980, pp. 153–178.
 Salvation Is the Issue. In: Mari Evans (editor), Black Women Writers (1950–1980): A Critical Evaluation. Garden City, NY: Anchor/Doubleday, 1984, pp. 41–47.

Anthologies 
 as Toni Cade (editor): The Black Woman: An Anthology. New York: New American Library, 1970
 Toni Cade Bambara (editor): Tales and Stories for Black Folks. Garden City, NY: Doubleday, 1971
 Foreword, This Bridge Called My Back. Persephone Press, 1981.

Produced screenplays 
 Zora. WGBH-TV Boston, 1971
 The Johnson Girls. National Educational Television, 1972.
 Transactions. School of Social Work, Atlanta University 1979.
 The Long Night. American Broadcasting Co., 1981.
 Epitaph for Willie. K. Heran Productions, Inc., 1982.
 Tar Baby. Screenplay based on Toni Morrison's novel Tar Baby. Sanger/Brooks Film Productions, 1984.
 Raymond's Run. Public Broadcasting System, 1985.
 The Bombing of Osage Avenue. WHYY-TV Philadelphia, 1986.
 Cecil B. Moore: Master Tactician of Direct Action. WHY-TV Philadelphia, 1987.
 W.E.B. Du Bois: A Biography in Four Voices (1995)

References

Further reading
 Cooper, Brittney C. (2017). Beyond Respectability: The Intellectual Thought of Race Women. Urbana, IL: University of Illinois Press.

External links 

Toni Cade Bambara Biography/Criticism, Selected Bibliography. Voices from the Gaps.
The Black Arts Movement
Malaika Adero, "Resembling a Revolutionary: My Sister Toni", The Feminist Wire, November 21, 2014.

1939 births
1995 deaths
20th-century African-American women writers
20th-century African-American writers
20th-century American educators
20th-century American non-fiction writers
20th-century American novelists
20th-century American poets
20th-century American short story writers
20th-century American women educators
20th-century American women writers
Activists from New York City
African-American feminists
African-American novelists
African-American poets
African-American short story writers
American Book Award winners
American documentary filmmakers
American feminists
American political activists
American women documentary filmmakers
American women non-fiction writers
American women novelists
American women poets
American women short story writers
City College of New York alumni
Deaths from cancer in Pennsylvania
Deaths from colorectal cancer
Educators from New York City
Novelists from New York (state)
Queens College, City University of New York alumni
Women anthologists
Writers from New York City